Vexillum gouldi is a species of small sea snail, marine gastropod mollusk in the family Costellariidae, the ribbed miters.

Description
The size of the shell varies between 5.8 mm and 9 mm.

Distribution
This marine species occurs off the Philippines.

References

 Salisbury R. & Guillot de Suduiraut E. (2006) Five new Costellariidae from the Philippine Islands taken by tangle net fisherman (Gastropoda: Muricoidea: Costellariidae). Visaya 1(6): 90–103.

External links
 

gouldi
Gastropods described in 2006